The Roman Catholic Diocese of Oran is a Roman Catholic diocese in the Ecclesiastical province of Algiers in Algeria.

History

The current diocese of Oran was created on 25 July 1866, with the diocese of Constantine, by dismemberment of the single diocese of Algiers (established in 1838). It is believed that its current population is around 9.8 million inhabitants spread over 9 departments, of which 1,500 are Catholic. At the time of Saint Augustine, about thirty bishoprics existed on the current extent of the diocese; from the 16th to the 18th centuries.

Oran, occupied by the Spaniards, depended on the Archbishop of Toledo. After the massive departure of the French at the independence of Algeria in 1962, then of foreign workers at the beginning of the Algerian Civil War, the Catholic community only has a few hundred members nowadays.

Special churches
The seat of the bishop is Cathédrale Sainte-Marie in Oran.

Ordinaries

Bishops of Oran 

 Jean-Baptiste-Irénée Callot ( – )
  ( – ), appointed Bishop of Digne, France
  ( – ), appointed Bishop of La Rochelle and Saintes, France
  ( – ), appointed Bishop of Perpignan-Elne, France
  ( – )
  ( – )
  ( – )
  ( – ), appointed Bishop of Périgueux (-Sarlat), France
  ( – )
 Bertrand Lacaste ( – )
 Henri Teissier ( – ), appointed Coadjutor Archbishop of Alger
 Pierre Lucien Claverie, OP ( – )
 Alphonse Georger ( – )
 Jean-Paul Vesco, OP ( –  , appointed Archbishop of Alger and is current administrator of Oran)

References

Sources

GCatholic.org

External links
catholic-hierarchy.org

Oran
Oran
Oran
Oran, Roman Catholic Diocese of
1866 establishments in Algeria